Ribandar is a town in Tiswadi, Goa, located between the cities of Panjim (Nova Goa) and Old Goa (Velha Goa).

Etymology
The name Ribandar originates from "Rayachem Bandar" in Konkani meaning the wharves, docks or portage of the Rayas or Kings. It is unclear which kings are meant here.
However, the Rayas of Sangama Dynasty of Vijayanagar are believed to have built this port.

Geography

It is separated from Panjim by the Rio de Ourém (River of Gold), whose junction with the Mandovi River here forms a large, wide, and marshy estuary. This estuary in traversed by an old causeway built in 1633 under the auspices of one of the viceroys of Portuguese India, the Count of Linhares, after whom it is named the Ponte Conde de Linhares. A new road to the south of Ponte Conde de Linhares provides one more link to Ribandar, Chimbel and Old Goa from Panjim.

The islands of Chorão and Divar lie to the north and north-east of Ribandar respectively. The ferry wharf at Ribandar is one of the major means of transportation to these two islands.

History
Goa was ruled by a break-away branch of the Kadamba dynasty belonging to native Kannada language speakers of Karnataka. It was conquered by Sultan Allauddin Khilji's General Mahmud Ghawan for the Delhi Sultanate, became part of the breakaway Bahamani Sultanate, conquered by Vijayanagar, Yusuf Adil Shah I of the Sultanate of Bijapur before being conquered by Afonso de Albuquerque in 1510.

Presently, although far separated geographically from Panjim by the Rio de Ourém, Ribandar has been made a part of the Corporation of the City of Panjim.

Landmarks
A Igreja de Nossa Senhora da Ajuda or The Church of Our Lady of Help (i.e. Auxiliatrix Christianorum or Perpetual Succour) was built on the banks of the Mandovi River in 1565. The ship bringing the body of St. Francis Xavier from Malacca was welcomed with canon salute at this church on the night of 14 March 1554. The church has a peculiar architectural style, being built like a ship.

The Santa Casa da Misericórdia or Holy House of Charity, also called the Royal Portuguese Hospital, today houses a management school, the Ribandar campus of the Goa Institute of Management. It is a heritage structure and has been left unchanged despite the pressures of housing a college.

Notable people
Ribandar is associated with the later life of Antonio Francisco Xavier Alvares (1836–1923), a disgruntled Catholic priest that left for the Syrian Orthodox Church, and was made Metropolitan of Goa, Ceylon and Greater India. Alvares consecrated Joseph René Vilatte (1854–1929) and thus is the person from whom most Old Catholic bishops in the West claim apostolic succession. Alvares is buried in St. Mary's Orthodox Syrian Church in Ribandar. There is also a cemetery on the left side of the Syrian Church. This cemetery belongs to the Roman Catholic church The Church of Our Lady of Help . There is also a very old school called Bal Bharathi Vidaya Mandir about less than 1 kilometer from the Syrian Church.

Gallery

References

Cities and towns in North Goa district